Pyrophleps is a genus of moths in the family Sesiidae.

Species
Pyrophleps ellawi Skowron Volponi, 2017
Pyrophleps nigripennis Arita & Gorbunov, 2000
Pyrophleps vitripennis Arita & Gorbunov, 2000
Pyrophleps zamesovi Gorbunov, 2021

References

Sesiidae